Zahra Dehghan Abnavi (born 11 February 1988 in Shiraz) is an Iranian archer.

She qualified for a place in archery in the 2012 Summer Olympics and took part in the women's recurve bow category.

References

Living people
Iranian female archers
Olympic archers of Iran
Archers at the 2012 Summer Olympics
Archers at the 2010 Asian Games
1988 births
Asian Games competitors for Iran
People from Shiraz
Sportspeople from Fars province
21st-century Iranian women